Aberavon (Welsh: Aberafan) is a constituency of the Senedd. It elects one Member of the Senedd by the first past the post method of election. Also, however, it is one of seven constituencies in the South Wales West electoral region, which elects four additional members, in addition to seven constituency members, to produce a degree of proportional representation for the region as a whole.

History

Having only elected Labour MSs with huge majority this can be considered a Labour safe seat. Plaid Cymru are Labour's main opposition in the constituency and have been since its creation.

Party averages from 5 elections: 
Labour – 54.9,
Plaid Cymru – 18.4,
Conservative – 9.3,
Lib Dem – 8.6,

UKIP stood for the first time in this constituency in the 2016 election and finished third with 15.0% of the vote.

Boundaries 

The constituency was created for the first election to the Assembly, in 1999, with the name and boundaries of the Aberavon Westminster constituency, and it is entirely within the preserved county of West Glamorgan. Boundaries were unchanged by the review whose proposals come into effect for the 2007 Welsh Assembly election.

The constituency is composed of the Neath Port Talbot electoral divisions: Aberavon, Baglan, Briton Ferry East, Briton Ferry West, Bryn & Cwmavon, Coedffranc Central, Coedffranc North, Coedffranc West, Cymmer, Glyncorrwg, Gwynfi, Margam, Port Talbot, Sandlands East, Sandlands West, and Tai-bach.

The other six constituencies of the region are Bridgend, Gower, Neath, Ogmore, Swansea East and Swansea West.

Voting 
In general elections for the Senedd, each voter has two votes. The first vote may be used to vote for a candidate to become the Member of the Senedd for the voter's constituency, elected by the first past the post system. The second vote may be used to vote for a regional closed party list of candidates. Additional member seats are allocated from the lists by the d'Hondt method, with constituency results being taken into account in the allocation.

Assembly members and members of the Senedd

Elections

Elections in the 2020s 

Regional Ballot void votes: 150. Want of an Official Mark (0), Voting for more than ONE party or individual candidate (38), Writing or mark by which the Voter could be identified (1), Unmarked or Void for uncertainty (111)

Elections in the 2010s

Regional ballots rejected at the count: 134

Elections in the 2000s 

2003 Electorate: 50,208
Regional ballots rejected: 348

Elections in the 1990s

See also 
Politics of Wales

Notes

References 

Senedd constituencies in the South Wales West electoral region
Politics of Glamorgan
1999 establishments in Wales
Constituencies established in 1999